Tritonicula is a genus of sea slugs, nudibranchs, shell-less marine gastropod molluscs in the family Tritoniidae. It contains species previously included in Tritonia as a result of a revision of the family Tritoniidae.

Species
Species within the genus Tritonicula include:
 Tritonicula bayeri (Ev. Marcus & Er. Marcus, 1967)
 Tritonicula hamnerorum (Gosliner & Ghiselin, 1987)
 Tritonicula myrakeenae (Bertsch & Osuna, 1986)
 Tritonicula pickensi (Ev. Marcus & Er. Marcus, 1967)
 Tritonicula wellsi (Er. Marcus, 1961)

References

Tritoniidae
Gastropod genera